Basics or BASICS may refer to:

Arts and entertainment
 The Basics (band), an Australian band
 The Basics (TV show), a 2021 American web series
 Basics (Houston Person album), a 1989 album by saxophonist Houston Person
 Basics (Paul Bley album), a 2001 solo album by pianist Paul Bley
 "Basics" (Star Trek: Voyager), the 42nd and 43rd episodes of the American science fiction television Star Trek: Voyager

Other uses
 British Association for Immediate Care, an organisation to encourage and aid the formation and extension of immediate care schemes

See also
 Basic (disambiguation)
 The Basics (disambiguation)
 Back to Basics (disambiguation)